Prelestnoye is a rural locality (a selo) and the administrative center of Prelestnenskoye Rural Settlement, Prokhorovsky District, Belgorod Oblast, Russia. The population was 892 as of 2010. There are 5 streets.

Geography 
Prelestnoye is located 11 km west of Prokhorovka (the district's administrative centre) by road. Mikhaylovka is the nearest rural locality.

References 

Rural localities in Prokhorovsky District